"Bounce 'n' Boom" is a 2011 song by Box Bottom featuring Big Babba. It reached No. 46 on the UK Singles Chart and has been featured in an advert for Vimto soft drinks. It has also been covered by Norfolk based local government worker, Anthony Martin. There has been speculation that 2020 will see a collaboration between Martin and local Basildon millionaire, Thomas Dugdale, working together on the Dugdale penned "Poinuts".

References

2011 songs
2011 singles
Drum and bass songs
All Around the World Productions singles
Song articles with missing songwriters